Glasgerion is Child ballad 67, (Roud 145), existing in several variants.

Synopsis

Glasgerion is a king's son and a harper.  He harps before another king, whose daughter arranges a tryst with him.  He tells his servant to ensure that he wakes in time to make the tryst.  The servant goes in his place and rapes the princess.  She learns the truth and kills herself, sometimes because she can not offer herself as Glasgerion's bride.  Glasgerion kills his servant and either kills himself as well or goes mad.

Motifs
The figure of Glasgerion was cited as a harper in Geoffrey Chaucer's The House of Fame and Gavin Douglas's The Palice of Honour.

Adaptations
In the 1960s, when the song had long fallen out of the tradition, the scholar and revivalist singer A.L. Lloyd ‘took it out and dusted it off a bit and set a tune to it and, I hope, started it on a new lease of life’ under the name of Jack Orion. This version, in which the harpist becomes a fiddler, appeared on his 1966 album First Person with Dave Swarbrick on fiddle. In the same year Bert Jansch made Jack Orion the title track of his third album. His voice is accompanied by his own guitar and that of John Renbourn; their collaboration here can be seen as one of the pinnacles of the so-called folk baroque guitar style. Jack Orion later became part of the repertoire of Pentangle, the band that they formed along with Terry Cox, Jacqui McShee and Danny Thompson, and appears on their 1970 recording Cruel Sister. Martin Carthy and Dave Swarbrick performed Jack Orion on their 1968 album But Two Came By. In the sleeve notes Carthy observed that ‘the song in its traditional form was, according to evidence at our [his and A. L. Lloyd’s] disposal, not very widespread, which serves to highlight one of the curious features of the folk revival, that is, the many songs which were not at all common in tradition are very commonly sung in the revival and vice versa.’

The British folk rock band Trees included a version of Glasgerion in The Garden of Jane Delawney, their 1970 debut album. Other renditions include one on Fairport Convention's 1978 album, Tipplers Tales (again with Dave Swarbrick on fiddle) and on Galley Beggar's 2015 album, Silence & Tears..
'Jack Orion' also appears Fay Hield and The Hurricane Party's third album Old Adam (2016).

References

Child Ballads
Rape in fiction
Fiction about suicide
Year of song unknown